The Black and White Minstrel Show was a British light entertainment show that ran for twenty years on BBC prime-time television. Running from 1958 to 1978, it was a weekly variety show that presented traditional American minstrel and country songs, as well as show tunes and music hall numbers, lavishly costumed. It was also a successful stage show that ran for ten years from 1962 to 1972 at the Victoria Palace Theatre, London. This was followed by tours of UK seaside resorts, together with Australia and New Zealand.

History 

Minstrel shows had become a long-established feature of British music halls and seaside entertainment since the success of acts such as the Virginia Minstrels in Liverpool in the 1840s and Christy's Minstrels in London in the 1850s. These led directly to many British imitators such as Hamilton's Black and White Minstrels in the 1880s and many others, with Uncle Mac's Minstrels becoming such a popular mainstay in Broadstairs from the 1890s to the 1940s, that a plaque was erected to honour their memory. Though any development in the performance of such acts may have ended before the First World war, the "old-time" minstrel theme remained a consistently popular form of entertainment well into the 1950s.

The Black and White Minstrel Show was created by BBC producer George Inns working with George Mitchell. It began as a one-off special in 1957 called The 1957 Television Minstrels featuring the male Mitchell Minstrels (Mitchell was the musical director) and the female Television Toppers dancers. The show was first broadcast on the BBC on 14 June 1958. It developed into a regular 45-minute show on Saturday evening prime-time television in a sing-along format with both solo and minstrel pieces (often with extended segueing), some country and western and music derived from other foreign folk cultures. The male minstrels performed in blackface; the female dancers and other supporting artists did not. The show included comedy interludes performed by Leslie Crowther, George Chisholm and Stan Stennett. It was initially produced by George Inns with George Mitchell. The minstrels' main soloists were baritone Dai Francis, tenor John Boulter, and bass Tony Mercer. During the nine years that the show was broadcast in black and white, the blackface makeup was actually red, as black did not register as well.

Prior to the creation of the Television Minstrels Show in 1957, the BBC Television Toppers had performed on air since February 1953. Originally the Television Toppers were dancers who performed weekly on a television show every Saturday night alongside different celebrities each week, such as Judy Garland. They also performed at Royal Command Performances. They were newspaper entertainment mini celebrities, and headlined as earning £1,000 a year in 1953.

The BBC Television Toppers were loaned for one day by the BBC under contract and appear in the film The Dam Busters (1955) in the spotlight theatre dancing scene. The filming of this scene was at the Lyric Theatre, Hammersmith. No credits are shown on this film as to who the dancers were or the location of the theatre.

By 1964, the show was achieving audience figures of 21 million. The Minstrels also had a theatrical show at the Victoria Palace Theatre produced by Robert Luff which ran for 6,477 performances from 1962 to 1972 and established itself in The Guinness Book of Records as the stage show seen by the largest number of people. At this time, the creation gained considerable international regard and was sold to over thirty countries; in 1961 the show won a Golden Rose at Montreux for best light entertainment programme and the first three albums of songs (1960–1962) were all hits, the first two being long-running number 1 albums in the UK Albums Chart. The first of these became the first album in UK album sales history to pass 100,000 sales.

In the spring of 1962, the BBC musical variety show, The Black and White Minstrel Show, was to open at the Victoria Palace Theatre. While the three lead singers, Tony Mercer, John Boulter and Dai Francis, would be in the theatrical version of the show and also in the BBC TV version, both the chorus singers and dancers would be different groups in the theatre and on BBC TV.

Opening in Melbourne in 1962, the show secured full houses for all evening and matinee performances, so they were held over. This happened in both countries, and every box-office record was broken. The show continued for three years, and the Australian and New Zealand box office records it set have never been broken.

While it started off being broadcast in black and white, the show was first shown in colour on BBC2 in 1967. Several personalities guested on the show, whilst others started their careers there. Comedian Lenny Henry, then in his teens, being the first black performer to appear on it in 1975. In July 2009, Henry explained that he was contractually obliged to perform and regretted his part in the show, telling The Times in 2015 that his appearance on the show led to a profound "wormhole of depression", and that he regretted his family not intervening to prevent him from continuing in the show.

Accusations of racism 
Within five years of the show's premiere on UK television, its portrayal of blacked-up characters behaving with stereotypical African American manners was already being observed as being offensive and racist. After the murder in Alabama in 1963 of 35-year-old white postal worker William Lewis Moore, who marched from Chattanooga, Tennessee, to Jackson, Mississippi, to protest against segregation in the American South, the satirical show That Was the Week That Was parodied the Black and White Minstrels trivialisation of the systemic racism in the Southern American states with a sketch in which Millicent Martin dressed as Uncle Sam and sang a parody of "I Wanna Go Back to Mississippi" ("Where the Mississippi mud / Kind of mingles with the blood / Of the niggers that are hanging from the branches of the trees"). accompanied by minstrel singers in blackface ("Mississippi, it's the state you've gotta choose / Where we hate all the darkies and the Catholics and the Jews / Where we welcome any man / Who is strong and white and belongs to the Ku Klux Klan").
  
David Hendy, Professor of Media and Cultural History at Sussex University, comments that Barrie Thorne, the corporation's chief accountant, described the series in an internal memo to Director of Television Kenneth Adam in 1962 as being "a disgrace and an insult to coloured people". He continued: "If black faces are to be shown, for heaven’s sake let coloured artists be employed and with dignity". Thorne raised the issue again in 1967 with Oliver Whitley, Chief Assistant to the BBC's director general Sir Hugh Greene. Whitley responded: "The best advice that could be given to coloured people by their friends would be: 'On this issue, we can see your point, but in your own best interests, for heaven's sake, shut up.

In 1967, the Campaign Against Racial Discrimination presented a petition to the BBC calling for the show to be cancelled. In 1968, the BBC experimented with a version of the show called Masquerade, where the main singers appeared without blackface and the black singers wore whiteface. In 1969, due to continuing accusations of racism, Music Music Music, a spin-off series in which the minstrels appeared without their blackface make-up, replaced The Black and White Minstrel Show. However, after one series, The Black and White Minstrel Show returned.

Since its cancellation in 1978, The Black and White Minstrel Show has come to be seen widely as a disgrace. BBC writer Kate Broome states, "That an innocently-intentioned show could, in just a generation, become such a screen pariah is one of the most extraordinary episodes in television history".

Final years 
The BBC1 TV show was cancelled in 1978 as part of a reduction in variety programming (by this point the blackface element had been reduced), while the stage show continued. A touring version toured continuously from 1960 until 1987, with a second company touring Australia and New Zealand from 1962 to 1965, 1969 to 1971, and 1978 to 1979. Having left the Victoria Palace Theatre, where the stage show played from 1962 to 1972, a second show toured almost every year to various big city and seaside resort theatres around the UK, including The Futurist in Scarborough, The Winter Gardens in Morecambe, The Festival Theatre in Paignton, The Congress Theatre in Eastbourne and The Pavilion Theatre in Bournemouth. This continued every year until 1989, when a final tour of three Butlins resorts (Minehead, Bognor Regis, and Barry Island) saw the last official Black and White Minstrel Show staged.

Legacy
In a 1971 episode of The Two Ronnies, a musical sketch, "The Short and Fat Minstrel Show", was performed as a parody of The Black and White Minstrel Show, featuring spoofs of various songs. An episode of the BBC comedy series The Goodies ("Alternative Roots"), spoofed the positive reception of The Black and White Minstrel Show, suggesting that any programme could double its viewing figures by being performed in blackface, and mentioning that a series of The Black and White Minstrel Show had been tried without make up.
The Are You Being Served? episode "Roots" featured a storyline in which Mr. Grace's lineage was traced in order to perform an appropriate song and dance for his 90th birthday. The result was a number that parodied The Black and White Minstrel Show by having the male performers in blackface while the females (excluding Mrs. Slocombe) were not.

Discography

The Black and White Minstrel Show

Another Black and White Minstrel Show

On Stage with the George Mitchell Minstrels

Other albums

References

External links

1958 British television series debuts
1978 British television series endings
1950s British television series
1960s British television series
1970s British television series
BBC Television shows
Blackface minstrel shows and films
British variety television shows
Race-related controversies in television